Melampsora caprearum is a fungal pathogen which causes galls on willows (Salix species). Also known as a rust fungus, it was first described by Felix von Thümen in 1879.

Description
Melampsora caprearum distorts the blades and veins of willow leaves, causing irregular spots with yellow-orange uredinia (which produce a powdery mass of spores). The rust has been found on eared willow (Salix aurita), goat willow (S. caprea), grey willow (S. cinerea) and their hybrids.

Distribution
Has been recorded from Belgium (photo), Finland, Great Britain (common) and Poland.

References

External links

Pucciniales
Fungal tree pathogens and diseases
Fungi described in 1879
Fungi of Europe
Willow galls
Taxa named by Felix von Thümen